Die Verlobung in San Domingo (The Engagement in San Domingo) is a 1960 opera by Werner Egk after Heinrich von Kleist, premiered on 22 November 1963 at the Bavarian State Opera.

Recording
Die Verlobung in San Domingo – Evelyn Lear, Margarethe Bence, Hans Günter Nöcker, Hamid Nasseri, Fritz Wunderlich, Richard Holm, Bayerisches Staatsorchester, Werner Egk

References

1960 operas
German-language operas
Operas based on works by Heinrich von Kleist
Operas by Werner Egk
Operas